Imre Markos (9 June 1908 – 27 September 1960) was a Hungarian football player and coach.

Career

Playing career
Markos, who played as a forward, spent his professional career in both Hungary and France, playing for Bocskai FC and Stade Rennais.

Markos also represented Hungary at international level, scoring five goals in twenty games between 1929 and 1935.

Coaching career
Markos managed CS Târgu Mureș, Debreceni VSC, TPS Turku, Degerfors IF, Pyrkivä Turku, Fenerbahçe and IFK Kristianstad.

References

1908 births
1960 deaths
Association football forwards
Hungarian footballers
Hungary international footballers
Stade Rennais F.C. players
Ligue 1 players
1934 FIFA World Cup players
Hungarian football managers
Hungarian expatriate football managers
Hungarian expatriate sportspeople in France
Hungarian expatriate sportspeople in Finland
Hungarian expatriate sportspeople in Turkey
Hungarian expatriate sportspeople in Sweden
Debreceni VSC managers
TPS Turku football managers
Degerfors IF managers
Fenerbahçe football managers
Place of birth missing